National Reso-Phonic Guitars is a manufacturer of resonator guitars and other resonator instruments including resonator mandolins, tenor instruments, and resonator ukuleles.

History
The company was formed in 1989 by Don Young and McGregor Gaines in a Southern California garage. They began producing resonator guitars under the name "National Reso-Phonic Guitars".

Since 1990, the factory has been located in San Luis Obispo, California. It currently produces over 600 instruments annually, offering more than 50 different models including Scheerhorn guitars. The company also repairs and restores vintage National instruments.  

National Reso-Phonic Guitars is currently owned by President/CEO Jason Workman.

Products
National Reso-Phonic Guitars model range includes not only the tricone and biscuit mechanisms used on the original National instruments, but also the inverted cone design used on the Dobro. National also builds and finishes small parts for other North American guitar and ukulele makers.

References

External links
 

Guitar manufacturing companies of the United States
Manufacturing companies based in California
Companies established in 1989